Euphrosyne nevadensis is a species of plant in the family Asteraceae. It is native to the western United States where it is found in Nevada, eastern California (Inyo and Mono Counties).

References

Flora of the United States
Heliantheae